The Garden is the fifth studio album by Kari Jobe. The album was released on February 3, 2017 by Sparrow Records alongside KAJE, LLC. Jeremy Edwardson worked on the production of the album.

Background
Kari Jobe, according to an article on The Christian Post website, took to Instagram to explain inspiration behind the album and the significance of the album's title track, "The Garden", saying: 
The Garden song is truly one of the most intimate songs I've ever written. It's a song that captures the raw emotion of truth. Truth of pain and sorrow that feels like it could swallow you up and suffocate you. There are moments we experience in life that knock the wind out of us and may cause us to question exactly what God is up to. God used a garden in my back yard to help me remember that He is always at work to turn extremely difficult situations into beauty. Everything we do in this life, on this side of heaven, is Kingdom oriented. There will always be pruning, planting, watering and growth. Different seasons have different experiences- but God is always up to something beautiful.

 – Kari Jobe, via Instagram

With regards to the song, "The Garden", Jobe also said it was to honor her sister, who had a stillborn daughter when she was seven-and-a-half months pregnant.

Singles
On November 4, 2016, "The Cause of Christ" was released as the lead single of the album. Another single, "Heal Our Land", was released on December 2, 2016. The third single from The Garden, "Let Your Glory Fall", was released on February 3, 2017.

Reception

Critical response

The Garden was met with positive reception from various critics. Joshua Andre of 365 Days Of Inspiring Media rated the album four and a half stars, saying "If you haven’t had the pleasure of listening to Kari Jobe’s albums before and are not sure whether to give her music a go, then I would say The Garden is the best way to start,". The four and a half star rating awarded by CCM Magazine’s Matt Conner was reasoned out of a belief that "The Garden speaks from a wide emotional range with the sort of quiet intensity for which Jobe is known" and that it "is an honest album from a trusted artist destined to be a friend at our weakest moments. " At The Christian Beat, Chris Major rated the album four out of five stars, saying "The diverse sounds and meaningful themes of The Garden make this collection stand out amongst Kari Jobe's work, if not in the praise and worship music community. From calm and contemplative moments of worship to rising, hopeful expressions of trust, each track is impactful." Giving the album nine squares out of a possible ten at Cross Rhythms, Tony Cummings concludes, "wherever you look on this set you'll hear a great voice passionately singing heart-warming songs." Indicating in a four star review from Jesus Freak Hideout, Nicole Marie Vacca writes, "Kari Jobe's The Garden is a moving, almost mesmerizing ode to God, making it perfect for times of personal worship and waiting on the Lord. "

Awards and accolades
On August 9, 2017, it was announced that The Garden would be nominated for a GMA Dove Award in the Worship Album of the Year and the Recorded Music Packaging of the Year categories at the 48th Annual GMA Dove Awards.

Commercial performance
The Garden made its debut on Billboard Christian Albums chart at No. 2 with 19,000 equivalent album units sold as of February 16, 2017.

On October 17, 2017, The Garden won the GMA Dove Award for Recorded Music Packaging of the Year with Kari Jobe alongside art producers Ezra Cohen, Jillian Cohen and Lindsey Pruitt as well as photographer Cameron Powell being the receipts at a ceremony at Allen Arena in Nashville, Tennessee.

Track listing

Charts

Album

Singles

Release history

References

2017 albums
Kari Jobe albums